Jean Dunn (born ) is a retired British track cyclist. She won bronze medals in the sprint at five consecutive world championships in 1958–1962, behind the Soviet riders Galina Ermolaeva and Valentina Maximova-Pantilova.

References 

1934 births
Living people
British female cyclists
20th-century British women